Cycloisomerase may refer to:

3-carboxy-cis,cis-muconate cycloisomerase (EC 5.5.1.2), an enzyme
Chloromuconate cycloisomerase (EC 5.5.1.7), an enzyme
Cycloeucalenol cycloisomerase (EC 5.5.1.9), an enzyme
Dichloromuconate cycloisomerase (EC 5.5.1.11), an enzyme
Tetrahydroxypteridine cycloisomerase (EC 5.5.1.3), an enzyme